Edward John Didymus (13 April 1886 – 12 April 1918), sometimes known as Fred Didymus, was an English professional footballer who played as an inside right in the Football League for Blackpool. He also played for Portsmouth, Huddersfield Town, Northampton Town, and Port Vale.

Career
Didymus played for his home-town club Portsmouth (Western League), Southern League club Northampton Town and Huddersfield Town, before joining Blackpool in 1909. He played two Second Division matches for the "Seasiders" in the 1909–10 season. In November 1910, he joined North Staffordshire & District League club Port Vale and made his debut in a 2–2 draw at Congleton Town on 26 November 1910. He scored four goals in a 9–0 Hanley Cup win over Goldenhill Catholics on 02 December before departing the club at the end of the year.

Personal life 
Didymus was married with five children and after his retirement from football in 1912, he worked as a tram driver for Portsmouth Corporation Transport. Prior to this, he was recorded as working as a greengrocer's apprentice in 1901 and as a general labourer in 1911. In 1915, during the second year of the First World War, he enlisted in the Army Service Corps. After being transferred to the Manchester Regiment, Didymus arrived on the Western Front in March 1918 and was then transferred to the Middlesex Regiment. On 12 April 1918, while serving near Neuville-Vitasse as a private, Didymus was shot and killed by a German sniper while attempting to rescue his lieutenant, who had been wounded shortly before. He was buried in Tilloy British Cemetery, Tilloy-lès-Mofflaines.

Career statistics

References

1886 births
1918 deaths
Footballers from Portsmouth
English footballers
Association football inside forwards
Portsmouth F.C. players
Northampton Town F.C. players
Huddersfield Town A.F.C. players
Blackpool F.C. players
Port Vale F.C. players
Western Football League players
Southern Football League players
English Football League players
Middlesex Regiment soldiers
British Army personnel of World War I
British military personnel killed in World War I
Royal Army Service Corps soldiers
Manchester Regiment soldiers
Deaths by firearm in France
Laborers